The Siedlce University of Natural Sciences and Humanities is a higher-education institution in Siedlce, Poland. It was created on October 1, 2010, by the decision of Sejm signed by the President of the Republic of Poland, Bronisław Komorowski. The previous name of the university was 'Akademia Podlaska w Siedlcach', in English known officially as University of Podlasie.

The history of the academic institution in Siedlce began in 1969. It has had four previous titles during its existence:
 1969–1974: Wyższa Szkoła Nauczycielska ("University of Education")
 1974–1977: Wyższa Szkoła Pedagogiczna ("University of Pedagogy")
 1977–1999: Wyższa Szkoła Rolniczo-Pedagogiczna ("University of Agriculture and Pedagogy")
 1999–2010: Akademia Podlaska ("Podlaska University")
 2010 onwards: Uniwersytet Przyrodniczo-Humanistyczny ("University of Natural Sciences and Humanities")

The university has four faculties: Natural Sciences, Humanities, Exact Sciences, Law and Economics Studies.

The university is eligible to give doctoral degrees in agronomy, biology, chemistry, history, safety science and zoology.

References

Universities in Poland
Agricultural universities and colleges in Poland
Teachers colleges in Poland